Blackwell is a surname of British origin. Notable people with the surname include:

 A. J. Blackwell (Andrew Jackson Blackwell, 18421903), American founder of and namegiver to Blackwell, Kay County, Oklahoma
 Adam Blackwell (active from 2002after 2005), Canadian diplomat
 Alan F. Blackwell (born 1962), New Zealand-British cognition scientist
 Albert T. Blackwell Jr. (1925–2022), Justice of the Maryland Court of Appeals
 Alex Blackwell (born 1983), female cricketer for New South Wales and Australia, identical twin sister of Kate
 Alex Blackwell (basketball) (Robert Alexander "Alex" Blackwell, born 1970), American basketball player
 Alexander Blackwell (17001747), Scottish adventurer, husband of Elizabeth Blackwell
 Alice Stone Blackwell (18571950), American feminist, suffragist, journalist and human rights advocate
 Anna Blackwell (1816-1900), English writer
 Antoinette Brown Blackwell (born Antoinette Louisa Brown, 18251921), American preacher and activist, first woman ordained as minister in the US, wife of Samuel C. Blackwell
 Sir Basil Blackwell (18891984), English publisher, son of Benjamin Henry Blackwell
 Ben Blackwell (born 1982), American musician, writer and archivist, founder of Cass Records
 Benjamin Henry Blackwell (18491924), English bookseller and politician, founder of Blackwell's chain of bookshops
 Betsy Blackwell (190585), American editor of women's magazines
 Brian David Blackwell (born 1982), American Swimming Coach. Born Pittsburgh, PA. 
 Brian Blackwell (born 1986), English schoolboy convicted of the manslaughter of his parents
 Bubba Blackwell (born 1966), American stunt performer and motorcycle jumping world record holder
 "Bumps" Blackwell (Robert Blackwell, 191885), American bandleader, songwriter, arranger and record producer
 Caesar Blackwell (17691845), enslaved African-American preacher
 Carlyle Blackwell (18841955), American silent film actor, director and producer
 Charles Blackwell (disambiguation), multiple people
 Charlie Blackwell (Charles H. "Rucker" Blackwell, 18941935), American Negro league baseball player
 Chris Blackwell (born 1937), English founder of Island Records
 Colin Blackwell (born 1993), American ice hockey player
 Cory Blackwell (born 1963), American basketball player
 "Crusher" Blackwell (Jerry Blackwell, (194995), American professional wrestler
 David Blackwell (19192010), American mathematician
 Dean Blackwell (born 1969), English footballer
 Deborah Blackwell (19502014), American television executive
 Dewayne Blackwell (1939–2021), American songwriter
 Donald Blackwell (19212010), British astronomer
 Douglas Blackwell (19242009), British actor
 Ed Blackwell (192992), American jazz drummer
 Edith Winstone Blackwell (18771956), New Zealand philanthropist
 Edward Blackwell, a mistaken name for Edward Backwell, 17th century English goldsmith banker and public official
 Elise Blackwell (born 1964), American novelist
 Elizabeth Blackwell (illustrator) (17071758), Scottish botanical illustrator and author, wife of Alexander Blackwell
 Elizabeth Blackwell (doctor) (18211910), British-American physician, first woman to receive a medical degree in the US, first woman on the UK Medical Register, sister of Emily and Sarah
 Elizabeth Marianne Blackwell (1889–1973), English botanist and mycologist
 Ellen Wright Blackwell (18641952), writer and botanist influential in New Zealand
 Emily Blackwell (18261910), British-American physician, one of the first American women physicians, sister of Elizabeth (physician) and Sarah
 Ernest Blackwell (18941964), English footballer
 Sir Ernley Blackwell (18681941), British lawyer and civil servant
 Ewell Blackwell (192296), American baseball pitcher

 Fred Blackwell (18911975), American baseball player
 Genieve Blackwell (active from 1989), Australian female Anglican bishop
 George Blackwell (15451613), English Roman Catholic Archpriest
 George Lincoln Blackwell (18611926), African-American author and bishop
 Gloria Blackwell (19272010), African-American civil rights activist and educator
 Grey Blackwell (born 1969), American illustrator and animator
 Hal Blackwell (active 2010), American financial analyst and author
 Harolyn Blackwell (born 1955), American theatrical and classical soprano
 Harry Blackwell (190056), English footballer
Helen Blackwell (born 1972), American chemist 
 Henry Blackwell (disambiguation), multiple people
 Hugh Blackwell (born 1944), American politician (North Carolina)
 Ian Blackwell (born 1978), English cricketer
 Isaac Blackwell (before 166499), English organist and composer
 Jack Blackwell (19092001), English footballer
 James Blackwell (disambiguation), multiple people
 Jannie L. Blackwell (active from 1992), American politician (Philadelphia), widow of Lucien E. Blackwell
 Jerry Blackwell ("Crusher" Blackwell, 194995), American professional wrestler
 John Blackwell (disambiguation), multiple people
 Josh Blackwell (born 1999), American football player
 Julius W. Blackwell (1797after 1845), US Congressman from Tennessee
 Kate Blackwell (born 1983), Australian female cricketer for New South Wales and Australia, identical twin sister of Alex
 Keith R. Blackwell (active after 2012), American judge (Georgia)
 Kelly Blackwell (born 1969), American football player
 Ken Blackwell (born 1948), American politician and activist in Ohio
 Kevin Blackwell (born 1948), English football goalkeeper and manager
 Kory Blackwell (born 1972), American football player
 Leslie Blackwell (18971959), Canadian politician, soldier, lawyer and land developer
 Lucien E. Blackwell (19312003), U.S. Congressman from Pennsylvania, husband of Jannie L. Blackwell
 Luke Blackwell (born 1986), Australian Rules footballer
 Marlon Blackwell (active from 1996at least 2014), American architect and academic
 Marquel Blackwell (born 1979), American football player
 Meredith Blackwell (born 1940), American mycologist
 Morton Blackwell (born 1939), American conservative political activist
 Nate Blackwell (born 1965), American basketball player
 Nick Blackwell (born 1990), British professional boxer
 Nigel Blackwell (born 1963), British frontman and songwriter of the band Half Man Half Biscuit
 Norman Blackwell, Baron Blackwell (born 1952) British businessman, public servant, politician, campaigner and policy advisor
 Olin G. Blackwell (191586) American prison official, fourth and final warden of Alcatraz Federal Penitentiary
 Otis Blackwell (19312002), American songwriter, singer, and pianist
 Otto B. Blackwell (18841970), American electrical engineer
 Pam Blackwell (born 1942), American Jungian educator and theorist, playwright and novelist
 Paul Blackwell (actor) (born 1954), Australian actor
 Paul Blackwell (footballer) (born 1963), Welsh footballer
 Pip Blackwell (Phil "Pip" Blackwell, born 1974), English darts player
 Randolph Blackwell (192781), American civil rights activist
 Richard Blackwell (MP) (by 15171568), English Member of Parliament
 Richard Blackwell ("Mr. Blackwell", 19222008), American fashion critic best known for his annual "worst dressed" lists
 Robby Blackwell (born 1986), American singer-songwriter, producer, and instrumentalist
 Robert Blackwell ("Bumps" Blackwell, 191885), American bandleader, songwriter, arranger, and record producer
 Robert J. Blackwell (born 1925), American maritime administrator
 Robert L. Blackwell (18951918), American Medal of Honor recipient
 Roger Blackwell (active from 1999), American marketing expert and public speaker
 Rory Blackwell (born 1933), British rock and roll musician
 "Rucker" Blackwell, (Charlie Blackwell, 18941935), American Negro league baseball player
 S. L. Blackwell (after 1878), American miner and politician (California)
 Samuel Charles Blackwell (18231901), Anglo-American abolitionist, husband of Antoinette Brown Blackwell
 Sarah Ellen Blackwell (1828–1901), American biographer and artist; sister of Elizabeth (physician) and Emily
 Scott Blackwell (active from 1992after 2011), American disk jockey and Christian dance music artist
 Scrapper Blackwell (Francis Hillman "Scrapper" Blackwell, 190362), American blues musician
 Simon Blackwell (born 1966), British comedy writer and producer
 Slade Blackwell (born 1968), American politician (Alabama)
 Susan Blackwell (active from 1995after 2008), American actress
 Thomas Blackwell (disambiguation), multiple people
 Tim Blackwell (baseball) (born 1952), American baseball player
 Tom Blackwell (born 1938), American photorealist painter
 Trevor Blackwell (born 1969), Canadian computer programmer, engineer and entrepreneur
 Unita Blackwell (1933–2019), American civil rights activist, the first African-American woman to be elected mayor in the state of Mississippi
 Victor Blackwell (born 1981), American journalist and television news anchor
 W. Blackwell (1835), English cricketer
 Wayne Blackwell (born 1960), Australian Rules footballer
 Will Blackwell (born 1975), American football player
 William Blackwell (disambiguation), multiple people

See also 
 Blackwell (disambiguation)
 

English-language surnames
English toponymic surnames